KEMO-TV (channel 50) is a television station licensed to Fremont, California, United States, serving the San Francisco Bay Area as an affiliate of the Spanish-language network Estrella TV. Owned by HC2 Holdings, the station maintains studios on Christie Avenue in Emeryville. Its transmitter, shared with KMTP-TV, KCNS, and KTNC-TV, is located atop Sutro Tower in San Francisco.

History
The station first went on the air in 1972. Originally licensed to Santa Rosa, it quickly attracted eager young broadcasters who honed their craft and went on to bigger markets. Among the Channel 50 pioneers were Jon Miller, now the longtime play-by-play voice of the San Francisco Giants, and Stan Atkinson, who would become one of the Sacramento area's best-known TV reporters and anchors.

This much anticipated effort to establish a local North Bay TV station in Santa Rosa, led by Atkinson and partner Kit Spier (formerly an executive at KNBC in Los Angeles), was under-financed and lasted only a year. The station was off the air more than it was on, and after the novelty of a new TV station wore off, viewers had little confidence and the station went dark.

Nothing more happened until 1981, when Wishard Brown, who had owned the Marin Independent Journal newspaper and San Rafael radio station KTIM, revived Channel 50 with an eye on making it a local news authority.

The second incarnation of KFTY went live in a former furniture store on Mendocino Avenue in May 1981 with broadcaster Jim Johnson (now an independent insurance and investment broker in Santa Rosa) as general manager.

A news department was formed with Bob Sherwood, formerly of KGO-TV (channel 7), as the station's first News Director and Rod Sherry, then a veteran KPIX anchor, as the weekend anchor and later news producer. Some of the news reporters included Deb Sherwood, Fred Wayne, Karen Clinton, Karen Provenza, Ed Beebout, and Diane Kaufman.

Through the 1980s, the local news operation expanded and became a training ground for more future big-market broadcasters such as Bill Martin, the veteran KTVU (channel 2) meteorologist, Manuel Gallegos, who went to CBS, Fred Wayne, who went to KCBS in San Francisco, and sportscaster Dale Julian, who later went to the San Jose Mercury newspaper.

News 50 adopted the slogan, "We do it twice, every night," upon expanding its weeknight news reports to 7:30 and 10:30 p.m. The "North Bay News" was a very popular look at regional stories that the TV stations in the central San Francisco Bay Area rarely covered; KFTY News also shared video tape of local news stories with other TV stations.

The third incarnation of KFTY took hold in the mid-1990s, when KFTY was sold to the television arm of Clear Channel Communications (now iHeartMedia); that company, after being bought out by private equity firms, announced the sale of KFTY and its other television stations on November 16, 2006. On January 26, 2007, weeks after Clear Channel announced plans to sell its stations, station manager John Burgess was ordered to shut down the news department, much to the disappointment of viewers in Sonoma, Marin, Napa, and Mendocino counties. Some of the reporters went to other TV stations, some retired, and some moved into other careers. Anchor Ed Beebout is now a communications professor at Sonoma State University, and reporter Curtiss Kim is now a co-anchor of the KSRO morning news in Santa Rosa.

On April 20, 2007, Clear Channel entered into an agreement to sell its entire television station group to Providence Equity Partners' Newport Television. Providence initially announced that it would not keep KFTY or its Bellingham, Washington sister station KVOS-TV; instead, those stations were to be turned over to LK Station Group.

Because LK could not obtain financing for the purchase, KFTY was instead sold to High Plains Broadcasting (Providence could not keep KFTY because it holds a 19 percent ownership stake in Univision Communications, which already owns two stations in the Bay Area market, KDTV-DT channel 14 and KFSF-DT channel 66). Newport Television began managing KFTY through a joint sales agreement (JSA), though High Plains controlled KFTY's programming.

On April 25, 2011, KFTY affiliated with the classic television network MeTV as part of an affiliation agreement between the network and Newport. Branded as "MeTV Bay Area," KFTY predominately aired MeTV programming from 10 a.m. to 11 p.m. on weekdays. In addition to MeTV programming, KFTY also carried syndicated and locally produced programming, including the weekday morning talk show Armstrong & Getty (a radio simulcast from KNEW, which aired from 6 to 10 a.m.), news and weather segments known as "Headlines and Weather on the Hour" that aired throughout the day (in addition to news segments anchored by Elisha Rivers that ran every half-hour during Armstrong & Getty), the Sunday evening discussion program YSN365 Sports Show hosted by Dave Cox, the community affairs program Your Turn, and the "pay-to-play" program TV 50 Marketplace, initially hosted by Nazy Javid and then by Angela Young.

The fourth incarnation of KFTY started on July 28, 2011, when High Plains Broadcasting announced plans to sell KFTY to Una Vez Más Holdings, LLC, with plans to affiliate KFTY with Azteca; The new owners changed the station's callsign to KEMO-TV, which was previously used as the callsign of KOFY-TV (channel 20) prior to 1986.

On September 29, 2011, KFTY switched its affiliation to Azteca, becoming one of two affiliates of the Spanish-language network in the Bay Area – alongside KOFY, which carried Azteca on its 20.4 subchannel; KOFY dropped Azteca programming shortly afterward. The MeTV affiliation moved to KOFY digital subchannel 20.2 on October 17, 2011.

In 2014, Una Vez Mas' TV assets (including KEMO-TV) were then sold to Northstar Media, LLC. In turn, HC2 Holdings acquired Northstar Media in addition to Azteca América on November 29, 2017, making KEMO an Azteca owned-and-operated station.

On March 29, 2021, KEMO flipped its main .1 channel to Estrella TV and moved Azteca programming to its .2 subchannel.

News operation
KFTY formed a news department in the late 1980s and began producing two half-hour local newscasts, airing at 7:00 and 10:00 p.m. each weeknight (these were promoted under the slogan, "We do it twice, every night."). KFTY cancelled these newscasts on January 26, 2007, citing insufficient revenue to support their continuation. Management denied the move was related to Clear Channel's intent to divest the station despite a similar incident at another Clear Channel station (WUTR in Utica, New York) in which all local newscasts on that station were cancelled in August 2003, followed by the sale of WUTR in early 2004. After its news department was shut down, KFTY only produced hourly local news updates between regular programs.

KEMO-TV airs national newscasts produced by Estrella TV. It does not currently produce any local news.

Technical information

Subchannels

The station's digital signal is multiplexed:

Analog-to-digital conversion
KEMO-TV (as KFTY) shut down its analog signal, over UHF channel 50, on February 17, 2009, the original date of the federally mandated transition from analog to digital television, which was later moved to June 12. The station's digital signal moved from its pre-transition UHF channel 54, which was among the high band UHF channels (52-69) that were removed from broadcasting use as a result of the transition, to UHF channel 32, using PSIP to display the KEMO-TV's virtual channel as 50 on digital television receivers.

References

External links
Azteca TV San Francisco

Television channels and stations established in 1972
Fremont, California
EMO-TV
EMO-TV
1972 establishments in California
Innovate Corp.